(singular ) or  (singular ) is the name for (federal) states in two German-speaking countries. It may more specifically refer to:
 States of Austria, the nine federal subdivisions of Austria
 States of Germany, the 16 federal subdivisions of Germany

See also
 Land (disambiguation)

German words and phrases

fr:Länder